Benjamin Stokke (born 20 August 1990) is a Norwegian football player currently playing as a striker for Kristiansund.

Career statistics

Club

References

1990 births
Living people
Sportspeople from Tønsberg
Norwegian footballers
FK Tønsberg players
Mjøndalen IF players
Sandefjord Fotball players
Levanger FK players
Kristiansund BK players
Randers FC players
Vålerenga Fotball players
Norwegian First Division players
Eliteserien players
Danish Superliga players
Expatriate men's footballers in Denmark
Norwegian expatriate footballers
Norwegian expatriate sportspeople in Denmark

Association football forwards